Danilo "Danny" Bautista Lacuna, Sr. (born March 20, 1938) is a Filipino lawyer and retired politician who last served as vice mayor of Manila from 1998 to 2007, the post he previously held from 1970 to 1971 and from 1988 to 1992. He also served as city councilor from 1967 to 1975. He is the founder of the Asenso Manileño local party. He also unsuccessfully ran for mayor of Manila in 2007 and representative of the 6th district of Manila in 2010. He is the father of incumbent Manila Mayor Honey Lacuna and was a well known mentor of former Mayor Isko Moreno.

References 

Living people
20th-century Filipino lawyers
Nacionalista Party politicians
Manila City Council members
Politicians from Manila
1938 births